In taxonomy, Leisingera is a genus of the Rhodobacteraceae.

References

Further reading

Scientific journals

Scientific books

Scientific databases

External links

Rhodobacteraceae
Bacteria genera